Susanne Groom is a British historian, an author and a former curator at Historic Royal Palaces. She lives in Kew in the London Borough of Richmond upon Thames.

Publications
 The Story of the Gardens at Hampton Court Palace, Historic Royal Palaces, 2016 
At the King's Table: Royal Dining Through the Ages (with a foreword by Heston Blumenthal), Merrell Publishers Ltd in association with Historic Royal Palaces, 2013 
 (with David Souden, Jane Spooner and Sally Dixon-Smith) Discover the Banqueting House, Historic Royal Palaces, 2011 
 Discover the Gardens: Official Guidebook (Hampton Court Palace), Historic Royal Palaces, 2008 
 (with Brett Dolman, Richard Fitch and Mard Meltonville) The Taste of the Fire: The Story of the Tudor Kitchens at Hampton Court Palace, Historic Royal Palaces, 2007 
 (with Lee Prosser) Kew Palace: The Official Illustrated History, Merrell Publishers Ltd, 2006 
(with Simon Thurley and Susan Jenkins) The Banqueting House, Historic Royal Palaces, 1997 
 (with Simon Thurley) Kew Palace, Official Guidebook, Historic Royal Palaces, 1995.

References

Living people
20th-century British historians
20th-century British women writers
21st-century British historians
21st-century British non-fiction writers
21st-century British women writers
British curators
British women historians
People associated with Historic Royal Palaces
People from Kew, London
Year of birth missing (living people)